Golina  is a village in the administrative district of Gmina Wołów, within Wołów County, Lower Silesian Voivodeship, in south-western Poland. 

In April 2014, Polish historian Krzysztof Grochowski unearthed seven gravestones of Jews that lived there during World War II.

References

Golina